Chlorococcum amblystomatis, synonym Oophila amblystomatis, commonly known as chlamydomonad algae or salamander algae, is a species of single-celled green algae. When placed in the genus Oophila, it was the only species. The Latin specific name amblystomatis means "loves salamander eggs". It does not occur anywhere in nature other than in the eggs of the spotted salamander, Ambystoma maculatum. The alga can invade and grow in the amphibian's egg capsule. Once inside, it metabolizes the carbon dioxide produced by the embryo and provides it with oxygen and sugar as a result of photosynthesis. This is an example of symbiosis, and the only known example of an intracellular endosymbiont microbe in vertebrates.

This symbiosis between Chlorococcum amblystomatis and the salamander may exist beyond the oocyte and early embryonic stage. Chlorophyll autofluorescence observation and ribosomal DNA analysis suggest that this algal species has invaded embryonic salamander tissues and cells during development and may even be transmitted to the next generation.

Chlorococcum amblystomatis are only found in freshwater in woodland ponds. Their optimal pH tolerance ranges from 6.26 to 6.46 and they require an environment where there is 12 hours of sunlight and 12 hours of darkness. Cells are motile are able to move the water by the use of a flagelluma. Oophila amblystomatis can also reproduce sexually and asexually. 16S rRNA has been partially sequenced as well as the 18S rRNA for the plasmid, however whole genome sequencing has not been done.

See also
 Spotted salamander
 Chlorogonium

References

Further reading

External links
 Green Eggs and Jam: Adaptations That Help Spotted Salamanders Reproduce at Henderson State University.
 Ambystoma maculatum at AmphibiaWeb. 
 Image of salamander egg with algae at North Carolina Museum of Natural Sciences.

Symbiosis
Flora of North America
Chlorococcaceae